The 1995 IAAF World Race Walking Cup was held on 29 and 30 April 1995 in the streets of Beijing, China.  The event was also known as IAAF/Reebok World Race Walking Cup.

Complete results were published.

Medallists

Results

Men's 20 km

Team (20 km Men)

Men's 50 km

Team (50 km Men)

Lugano Trophy (Team overall Men)
The Lugano Trophy, combined the 20 km and 50 km events team results.

Women's 10 km

Eschborn Cup (Team Women 10 km)

Participation
The participation of 330 athletes (226 men/104 women) from 36 countries is reported.

 (8/5)
 (8/4)
 (3/-)
 (3/5)
 (10/5)
 (8/-)
 (4/-)
 (3/-)
 (-/3)
 (3/-)
 (7/3)
 (10/5)
 (9/4)
 (6/5)
 (6/-)
 (10/5)
 (7/5)
 (6/3)
 (3/-)
 (7/3)
 (5/3)
 (10/5)
 (4/-)
 (4/4)
 (3/3)
 (8/4)
 (10/5)
 (8/-)
 (6/4)
 (9/4)
 (8/3)
 (3/-)
 (7/4)
 (7/5)
 (10/5)
 Yugoslavia (3)

See also
 1995 Race Walking Year Ranking

References

External links
IAAF World Race Walking Cup 1961-2006 Facts & Figures - IAAF.org

World Athletics Race Walking Team Championships
World Race Walking Cup
World Race Walking Cup
International athletics competitions hosted by China